This is a list of women artists who were born in Estonia or whose artworks are closely associated with that country.

A
Ellinor Aiki (1893–1969), painter

H
Epp Haabsaar (born 1953), painter, illustrator
Julie Wilhelmine Hagen-Schwarz (1824–1902), Baltic-German painter

I
Inéz (active since mid-1990s), contemporary artist, musician, composer

J
Alisa Jakobi (born 1981), painter, actress, graphic designer

K
Elvy Kalep (1899–1989), pilot, painter, toy designer, writer
Kalli Kalde (born 1967), graphic artist, illustrator
Liis Koger (born 1989), painter, poet
Meeli Kõiva (born 1960), painter, sculptor, glass designer

M
Kadri Mälk (born 1958–2023), painter, jewelry designer
Eveline Adelheid von Maydell (1890–1962), silhouette artist
Lydia Mei (1896–1965), painter
Natalie Mei (1900–1975), painter, graphic artist

N
Katja Novitskova (born 1984), installation artist
Mall Nukke (born 1964), painter, collage artist, installation artist

P 

 Birgit Püve (born 1978), photographer

S
Viive Sterpu (1953–2012), artist, glass designer

T
Katrina Tang (born 1985), photographer
Ann Tenno (born 1952), photographer
Tio Tepandi (born 1947), theatre designer

V
Agaate Veeber (1901–1988), graphic artist
Erna Viitol (1920–2001), sculptor

W
Ilon Wikland (born 1930), painter, illustrator

-
Estonian women artists, List of
Artists
Artists